Anecy Rocha (26 October 194226 March 1977) was a Brazilian actor.

On 26 October 1942, Anecy Rocha was born in Vitória da Conquista, Bahia, Brazil.  She was the sister of film director Glauber Rocha, and died on 26 March 1977.

Film credits

References

External links
 

1942 births
1977 deaths
20th-century Brazilian actresses
Brazilian film actresses
people from Vitória da Conquista